Joseph Lawrence Stewart (March 11, 1879 – February 9, 1913), nicknamed "Ace", was a Major League Baseball pitcher who played in  with the Boston Beaneaters. He batted and threw right-handed. Stewart had a 0-0 record, with a 9.64 ERA, in 2 games, in his one-year career.

He was born in Monroe, North Carolina and died in Youngstown, Ohio.

External links

1879 births
1913 deaths
Major League Baseball pitchers
Baseball players from North Carolina
Boston Beaneaters players
Erskine Flying Fleet baseball players
New Orleans Pelicans (baseball) players
Wilmington Giants players
Shreveport Giants players
St. Paul Saints (AA) players
Toledo Mud Hens players
Zanesville Moguls players
Marion Moguls players
Macomb Potters players